Malik Davis (born November 26, 1998) is an American football running back for the Dallas Cowboys of the National Football League (NFL). He played college football at Florida from 2017 to 2021.

Professional career
After going undrafted in the 2022 NFL draft, Davis signed with the Dallas Cowboys as a free agent on 30 April 2022. After failing to secure a place in the 53-man roster, he signed with the Dallas' practice squad in August 2022. On October 15, 2022, Davis was elevated to the active roster. He was signed to the active roster on October 29.

References

1998 births
Living people
American football running backs
Florida Gators football players
Dallas Cowboys players